Günter Deckert (14 September 1950, in Ehrenfriedersdorf – 24 November 2005) was an East German nordic combined skier who competed in the early 1970s. He won a silver medal in the individual event at the 1974 FIS Nordic World Ski Championships in Falun. He competed for the Sportvereinigung (SV) Dynamo. He also competed at the 1972 Winter Olympics and the 1976 Winter Olympics.

References

External links

1950 births
2005 deaths
German male Nordic combined skiers
FIS Nordic World Ski Championships medalists in Nordic combined
Olympic Nordic combined skiers of East Germany
Nordic combined skiers at the 1972 Winter Olympics
Nordic combined skiers at the 1976 Winter Olympics